Markshawius is a genus of braconid wasps in the family Braconidae. There are at least three described species in Markshawius.

Species
These three species belong to the genus Markshawius:
 Markshawius erucidoctus Fernandez-Triana & Boudreault, 2018 (Vietnam)
 Markshawius francescae Fernandez-Triana & Boudreault, 2018 (Nepal, Vietnam, Thailand)
 Markshawius thailandensis Fernandez-Triana & Boudreault, 2018 (Thailand)

References

Microgastrinae